Simon Mottram is one of the founders  and former Chief Executive of Rapha, a sportswear and lifestyle brand focused on road bicycle racing, clothing and accessories.

Early career

Simon worked for 15 years as a director of brand consultancy at Interbrand and a partner at a number of agencies, with a main focus on business relationships with luxury brands. He founded Rapha in 2004.

He is also qualified as a chartered accountant with Price Waterhouse.

Personal life

Simon lives in London with his wife and three children.

References

1966 births
Living people
People from Rotherham
Businesspeople from London